Marko Kemppainen (born 13 July 1976 in Kajaani) is an athlete from Finland. He competes in skeet shooting.

Kemppainen won a bronze medal at the 2001 World Championship in Cairo. He represented Finland at the 2004 Summer Olympics. By winning the silver medal in men's skeet event he took the first medal for Finland in the Athens Olympics.

References

1976 births
Living people
People from Kajaani
Finnish male sport shooters
Olympic shooters of Finland
Olympic silver medalists for Finland
Skeet shooters
Shooters at the 2004 Summer Olympics
Olympic medalists in shooting
Shooters at the 2015 European Games
European Games bronze medalists for Finland
European Games medalists in shooting
Medalists at the 2004 Summer Olympics
Sportspeople from Kainuu
20th-century Finnish people
21st-century Finnish people